Alterazioni Video is an artist collective founded in 2004 in Milan, Italy and is now based in New York and Berlin. The members of the group are Paololuca Barbieri Marchi, Alberto Caffarelli, Matteo Erenbourg, Andrea Masu and Giacomo Porfiri.

Alterazioni Video (Art collective)

Since 2004, Alterazioni Video has participated in international exhibitions such as Disobedience (Künstlerhaus Bethanien, Berlin 2005), 52nd International Art Exhibition (Venice Biennale, 2007), Remote Control (MoCA, Shanghai 2007, Manifesta (Rovereto 2008) and Freak Out (Greene Naftali Gallery, New York 2013). They have also had solo shows in institutions such as the Chelsea Art Museum (New York, 2006), MAR Museum of Art Ravenna (Ravenna, 2010) and Viafarini (Milan, 2012).

In 2007, for the 52° Venice Biennale, in the main exhibition curated by Robert Storr, the group showed Painting (16:9 colour HD, 16' 33", 2007), a work that documents the continued stratification of writings and cancellations on the outer walls of the San Vittore prison in Milan. Writings, images, and attempts at censorship become the linguistic elements of only one work, one large "painting" that documents, in its progress, the life of a community.

They are also known for creating "Incompiuto Siciliano", a term coined by the artist to represent a contemporary architectural movement that produces instant ruins. Since 2006 the collective has catalogued more than 600 unfinished public infrastructures such as bridges, motorways, hospitals, stadia, prisons and theatres, scattered over the Italian territory, defined as an architectural style that represents Italy in the last 50 years. Incompiuto Siciliano has become a subject of study in the polytechnics and is discussed extensively in the Italian media as well as internationally.

In 2009, the group was invited to take part of the Biennial of performing art Performa 09 NY, together with the Icelandic artist Ragnar Kjartansson with a performance titled Symphony n°1.

Works 

 2012, Kadist Art Foundation, founded by Matteo Lucchetti, Paris, France, 2012
 Lavazh Parti, for an Albania clean as my car, Tirana / Albania 2011 
 Acapulco  (CENSORED SHOW), Critica in Arte, curated by Camilla Boemio, Mar Museo dell'Arte di Ravenna, Ravenna, Italy, 2010
 All my friends are dead, 21x21, 21 Artisti per il 21° secolo, Fonadazione Sandretto Re Rebaudengo, curated by Francesco Bonami, Torino, Italy, 2009
 Symphony n°1, Allegro ma non troppo un poco maestoso, Curated by Barbara Casavecchia and Caroline Corbetta, Performa, New York, 2009,
 I WOULD PREFER NOT TO, a love story set on Google images, Prometeo Gallery, Milan 2009
 VELIKI CEVAPCIC (the big cevapcic), world record Guinness for the biggest meat-ball in the earth, 23 September 2008, Ljubljana, Slovenia
 COPY_RIGHT_NO_COPY_RIGHT, file sharing platform, Manifesta 7, curated by Adam Budak, Rovereto, 2008
 NIGHT TALK OF THE FORBIDDEN CITY,DDM Warehouse Gallery, Shanghai, China, 2007
 NO THINK, NO PLAN, NO SLEEP, U.S. Army Weapon, Tomorrow now, Fondazione Bevilacqua Lamasa, Venice, 2006
 WAITING FOR THE TSUNAMI web TV live show, La Creazione della Realtà, curated by Emanuela Gandini, artandgallery, Milan, Italy
 LEGAL SUPPORT fund raising Empowerment, curated by Marco Scotini, Museo d’Arte Contemporanea Villa Croce, Genova, Italy, 2004

References

External links 
 alterazionivideo.com homepage
 artfacts
 Manifesta 07
 Prometeo Gallery

Italian artist groups and collectives
Italian contemporary artists